Shumway may refer to:

Places
 Shumway, Arizona, a populated place in Navajo County, Arizona
 Shumway, Illinois, a village in the U.S.

People
 DeVan L. Shumway (1930–2008), publisher
 Eric B. Shumway (born 1939), former college president
 F. Ritter Shumway (1906–1992), figure skater
 James Shumway (1939–2003), American politician
 John Shumway, journalist
 Lee Shumway (1884–1959), American actor
 Matt Shumway (born 1978), visual effects artist
 Naomi M. Shumway (1922–2004), church executive
 Nehemiah Shumway (1761–1843), composer
 Norman Shumway (1923–2006), pioneering American heart surgeon
 Norman D. Shumway (1934–2022), U.S. Representative from California
 Perley J. Shumway, American politician
 R. H. Shumway, businessman and company name

Other uses
 Shumway (software), an open source Adobe Flash player built upon JavaScript and HTML5
 Julia Shumway, a fictional character in the TV series Under the Dome
 Gordon Shumway, the fictional title character in the U.S. sitcom ALF